Fritz Aanes (born 20 July 1978) is a Greco-Roman wrestler from Narvik, Norway.

At the 2000 Summer Olympics he finished fourth in the 85 kg category. However he later tested positive for the banned substance nandrolone and was banned for 15 months.

He made a comeback in Wrestling at the 2004 Summer Olympics in the 84 kg category, but finished lowly in the rankings.

References

External links
 

1978 births
Living people
Wrestlers at the 2000 Summer Olympics
Norwegian male sport wrestlers
Wrestlers at the 2004 Summer Olympics
Olympic wrestlers of Norway
Doping cases in wrestling
Norwegian sportspeople in doping cases
People from Narvik
Sportspeople from Nordland
21st-century Norwegian people